Centropogon rubiginosus is a species of plant in the family Campanulaceae.

Distribution and habitat
Centropogon rubiginosus is endemic to Ecuador.  Its natural habitat is subtropical or tropical moist montane forests. It is found in terrestrial environments.

Conservation
Centropogon rubiginosus is threatened by habitat loss. This species is recorded to be an endangered species. The species is plentiful in the area that it grows in, but it is being threatened by fires that are man-made and the agriculture modernization.

References

Flora of Ecuador
rubiginosus
Endangered plants
Taxonomy articles created by Polbot